Mordellistena protogaoa is a species of beetle in the genus Mordellistena of the family Mordellidae. It was described by Wickham in 1915.

References

Beetles described in 1915
protogaoa